Sar Kahriza (also Romanized as Sar Kahrīzā; also known as Sar Kahzā) is a village in Khormarud-e Shomali Rural District, in the Central District of Azadshahr County, Golestan Province, Iran. At the 2006 census, its population was 295, in 79 families.

References

Populated places in Azadshahr County